The Monastery of San Xoán de Caaveiro is a Galician monastery founded in the tenth century by Saint Rudesind.  It is situated in A Capela, in Galicia, within the Fragas do Eume natural park.

References

External links 

 Information about the monastery

Province of A Coruña
Monasteries in Galicia (Spain)
Benedictine monasteries in Spain
Romanesque architecture in Galicia (Spain)
Buildings and structures completed in the 10th century
Bien de Interés Cultural landmarks in the Province of A Coruña